The 8th Indiana Volunteer Infantry Regiment was an infantry regiment that served in the Union Army during the American Civil War.

Service
The 8th Indiana Volunteer Infantry was organized at Indianapolis, Indiana, on April 21, 1861, for a three-month enlistment. On June 19, 1861, the regiment was moved to Clarksburg, West Virginia, and attached to William Rosecrans' Brigade, in George B. McClellan's Provisional Army of West Virginia. On June 29, it was marched  to Buckhannon, West Virginia, and occupied Buckhannon on June 30. The regiment engaged in the Western Virginia Campaign, July 6–17, fighting in the Battle of Rich Mountain on July 11. The regiment was mustered out of service on August 6, 1861.

Total strength and casualties
The regiment lost 5 enlisted men (Alfred Wilson, Richard Lamb, First sergeant Frank Mays, Private John Scotten, and Alfred Lowder) killed in action or died of wounds and 3 enlisted men  who died of disease, for a total of 8 fatalities.

Commanders
 Colonel David Shunk

See also

 List of Indiana Civil War regiments
 Indiana in the Civil War

Notes

References
The Civil War Archive - Indiana Units
Civil War - Indiana 

Military units and formations established in 1861
Military units and formations disestablished in 1861
Units and formations of the Union Army from Indiana
1861 establishments in Indiana